

Verkhnevilyuysk (Üöhee Bülüü) is a rural locality (a selo) and the administrative center of Verkhnevilyuysky District of Sakha Republic, Russia. Its population as of the 2010 Census was 6,457, of whom 3,015 were male and 3,442 female, down from 6,555 as recorded during the 2002 Census.

Geography
Verkhnevilyuysk is located in the Central Yakutian Lowland, by the Vilyuy River, near its confluence with the Tyukyan.

Transportation
Verkhnevilyuysk is served by the Verkhnevilyuysk Airport .

References

Notes

Sources
Official website of the Sakha Republic. Registry of the Administrative-Territorial Divisions of the Sakha Republic. Verkhnevilyuysky District. 

Rural localities in Verkhnevilyuysky District
Central Yakutian Lowland